The Central Dauphin School District is a large, suburban, public school district located in suburban Harrisburg, Pennsylvania serving students in central and eastern Dauphin County. It is the largest school district in the county, the largest in the greater Harrisburg metropolitan area and is the 9th largest school district in Pennsylvania. The district serves the Boroughs of: Dauphin, Paxtang and Penbrook as well as Lower Paxton Township, Middle Paxton Township, Swatara Township and West Hanover Township. It was created in 1954, combining four smaller districts. According to 2000 federal census data, it served a resident population of 83,750. By 2010, the district's population increased to 90,442 people. The educational attainment levels for the Central Dauphin School District population (25 years old and over) were 91.8% high school graduates and 30.4% college graduates.

According to the Pennsylvania Budget and Policy Center, 39.3% of the district's pupils lived at 185% or below the Federal Poverty level as shown by their eligibility for the federal free or reduced price school meal programs in 2012. In 2009, Central Dauphin School District residents' per capita income was $23,896, while the median family income was $56,338. In Dauphin County, the median household income was $52,371. By 2013, the median household income in the United States rose to $52,100.

High school students may choose to attend Dauphin County Technical School for training in the construction and mechanical trades. The Capital Area Intermediate Unit IU15 provides the district with a wide variety of services like specialized education for disabled students and hearing, speech and visual disability services and professional development for staff and faculty.

Central Dauphin School District contracts Krise Transportation to operate its main transportation system & Boyo Transportation and Sweger Bus Lines for special services. The prior contractor was Durham School Services. At one point in the early 2000's the district had its own fleet and employees before deciding to contract out its transportation services.

Schools
Central Dauphin School District operates two high schools (9th-12th), four middle schools (6th-8th), 13 elementary schools (grades K-5th), and the CD Cyber Academy.

References

External links
 

Education in Harrisburg, Pennsylvania
1954 establishments in Pennsylvania
School districts established in 1954
Susquehanna Valley
School districts in Dauphin County, Pennsylvania